The 1950 Minnesota Golden Gophers football team represented the University of Minnesota in the 1950 Big Nine Conference football season. In their 16th year under head coach Bernie Bierman, the Golden Gophers compiled a 1–7–1 record and were outscored by their opponents by a combined total of 196 to 79.
 
Wayne Robinson was awarded the Team MVP Award.

Total attendance for the season was 267,015, which averaged to 53,403. The season high for attendance was against Iowa.

Schedule

Game summaries

Michigan

In its fifth game, Minnesota lost to Michigan.  After a scoreless first half, Michigan drove down the field culminating in a two-yard run by Don Dufek.  Minnesota tied the game with a touchdown in the final two minutes to tie the game at 7-7.  Dufek rushed for 63 yards, but the Minnesota team held Michigan to a total of only 46 yards rushing as Chuck Ortmann was held to -38 rushing yards.  With the tie game, Michigan retained possession of the Little Brown Jug.

References

Minnesota
Minnesota Golden Gophers football seasons
Minnesota Golden Gophers football